Malnutrition is an important health concern in Tibet. According to a study conducted in 1994/1995 in eleven districts of Tibet, malnutrition affected more than half of the children from 1–7 years old. The major cause was poverty.

See also 
 Health in China

References 

Health in Tibet